The Raja Tun Uda Ferry Terminal is a ferry slip within the city of George Town in Penang, Malaysia. Situated at Weld Quay in the city centre, this docking facility is used for Penang Ferry services between George Town and Butterworth on the Malay Peninsula. The ferry terminal was completed in the 1960s.

In addition to ferry services, the ferry terminal is located adjacent to the Weld Quay Bus Terminal, thus allowing ferry commuters to take Rapid Penang public buses to various destinations within the city.

History 
In 1901, the FMSR (Federated Malay States Railways) Jetty was completed at the site where the Raja Tun Uda Ferry Terminal now stands. Measuring , it was the longest jetty along Weld Quay at the time. Ferry steamers that carried train passengers from Butterworth into George Town (and vice versa) would dock at the jetty.

The FMSR Jetty was eventually replaced by the present-day Raja Tun Uda Ferry Terminal in the 1960s. The Raja Tun Uda Ferry Terminal was named after Raja Uda bin Raja Muhammad, who became the first Governor (Malay: Yang di-Pertua Negeri) of Penang after the independence of Malaya in 1957.

The ferry terminal is now run by Prasarana Malaysia, the corporate entity that manages both Rapid Ferry and Rapid Penang, following the body's acquisition of Penang's ferry services in 2017.

See also 
 Rapid Ferry
 Sultan Abdul Halim Ferry Terminal

References 

Buildings and structures in George Town, Penang
Ferry terminals in Malaysia
Transport in Penang